Amouri is a village and a community of the Elassona municipality. Before the 2011 local government reform it was a part of the municipality of Potamia, of which it was a municipal district. The 2011 census recorded 312 inhabitants in the village. The community of Amouri covers an area of 7.328 km2.

Economy
The population of Amouri is occupied in animal husbandry and agriculture (mainly tobacco, grain and other cereals).

Population
According to the 2011 census, the population of the settlement of Amouri was 312 people, a decrease of almost 22% compared with the population of the previous census of 2001.

See also
 List of settlements in the Larissa regional unit

References

Populated places in Larissa (regional unit)